Masters of Men is a 1923 American silent war drama film directed by David Smith and starring Earle Williams,  Alice Calhoun and Wanda Hawley. It takes place against the backdrop of the 1898 Spanish-American War. It is based on the 1901 novel Masters of Men by Morgan Robertson.

Plot
After falsely being accused of theft really committed by his sweetheart Mabel 's brother, Dick Halpin runs away to join the Navy. Later shanghaied he is held prisoner by the Spanish in Santiago Harbor, escaping just in time to rejoin his ship and take part in the Spanish-American War. Returning home a hero after a sea battle, his name is cleared and he reconciles with Mabel.

Cast
Earle Williams as Lt. Breen
Alice Calhoun as Mabel Arthur
Cullen Landis as Dick Halpin
Wanda Hawley as Bessie Fleming
Dick Sutherland as 'Pig' Jones
Charles Mason as Sawyer
Bert Appling as Mr. Thorpe 
Jack Curtis as Capt. Bilker
Martin Turner as 'Nigger'

References

Bibliography

External links

1923 drama films
1923 war films
1920s English-language films
American silent feature films
1920s war drama films
American war drama films
Films directed by David Smith (director)
American black-and-white films
Vitagraph Studios films
Films set in the 1890s
Seafaring films
Films set in Cuba
Spanish–American War films
Films based on American novels
1920s American films
Silent American drama films
Silent adventure films
Silent war drama films